Estir (also Romanized as Estīr; also known as Sūder) is a village in Qasabeh-ye Gharbi Rural District, in the Central District of Sabzevar County, Razavi Khorasan Province, Iran. At the 2006 census, its population was 781, in 258 families.

A brief history

Estir was a Jewish village in northeast Iran which has been named after Esther, the Jewish queen of the Persian king Xerxes I.

References 

Populated places in Sabzevar County